A yurt (from the Turkic languages) or ger (Mongolian) is a portable, round tent covered and insulated with skins or felt and traditionally used as a dwelling by several distinct nomadic groups in the steppes and mountains of Inner Asia. The structure consists of a flexible angled assembly or latticework of wood or bamboo for walls, a door frame, ribs (poles, rafters), and a wheel (crown, compression ring) possibly steam-bent as a roof. The roof structure is sometimes self-supporting, but large yurts may have interior posts supporting the crown. The top of the wall of self-supporting yurts is prevented from spreading by means of a tension band which opposes the force of the roof ribs. Yurts take between 30 minutes and 3 hours to set up or take down, and are generally used by between five and 15 people. Nomadic farming with yurts as housing has been the primary life style in Central Asia, particularly Mongolia, for thousands of years.

Modern yurts may be permanently built on a wooden or concrete platform; they may use modern materials such as metal framing, plastics, plexiglass dome, or radiant insulation.

Etymology and translations 

Old Turkic yurt "tent, dwelling, abode, range" may have been derived from the Old Turkic word ur - verb with the suffix +Ut. In modern Turkish and Uzbek, the word "yurt" is used as the synonym of "homeland" or a "dormitory", while in modern Azerbaijani, "yurd" mainly signifies "homeland" or "motherland". In Russian, the structure is called "yurta" (юрта), whence the word came into English.

Translations 

 // – in use in Azerbaijani, Turkish and Bashkir languages.
  (transliterated: ger) – in Mongolian simply means "home".
  is the Bashkir term for yurt.
  (transliterated:) – the Kazakh word, and means "felt house".
  (transliterated:) – the Kyrgyz term is meaning "grey house", because of the color of the felt.
  and  – in Qaraqalpaq the first term means "black house", while the second means "a newborn family" and is used only to name a young family's yurt.
 In Hungarian yurt is called "". Besides the more scientific modern-era word "", Hungarians in everyday life still use "" for all tent-like dwellings, which could be the original word Hungarians used for yurts in historic times.
 In Bulgarian yurt is called "юрта" (yurta).
 "Kherga"/"Jirga" – Afghans call them.
 "Khema" (خیمه/ख़ेमा) in Hindustani is the word for a yurt or a tent-like dwelling in India and Pakistan, from the Arabic: خَيْمَة
 In Persian yurt is called  (châdor)
 In Tajik the names are "yurt", "khona-i siyoh", "khayma" (юрт, хонаи сиёҳ, хайма).
  is the Tuvan word for yurt.
 кереге (//) is the Southern Altai word for a yurt made from felt.
 A Yaranga is a tent-like traditional mobile home of some nomadic Northern indigenous peoples of Russia, such as Chukchi and Siberian Yupik.

History 
Yurts have been a distinctive feature of life in Central Asia for at least two and a half thousand years. The first written description of a yurt used as a dwelling was recorded by the ancient Greek historian Herodotus. He described yurt-like tents as the dwelling place of the Scythians, a horse riding-nomadic nation who lived in the northern Black Sea and Central Asian region from around 600 BC to AD 300.

Construction 

Traditional yurts consist of an expanding wooden circular frame carrying a felt cover. The felt is made from the wool of the flocks of sheep that accompany the pastoralists. The timber to make the external structure is not to be found on the treeless steppes, and must be obtained by trade in the valleys below.

The frame consists of one or more expanding lattice wall-sections, a door-frame, bent roof poles and a crown. The Mongolian Ger has one or more columns to support the crown and straight roof poles. The (self-supporting) wood frame is covered with pieces of felt. Depending on availability, felt is additionally covered with canvas and/or sun-covers. The frame is held together with one or more ropes or ribbons. The structure is kept under compression by the weight of the covers, sometimes supplemented by a heavy weight hung from the center of the roof. They vary with different sizes, and relative weight. They provide a large amount of insulation and protection from the outside cold of winters, and they are easily changed to keep the yurts cool for summertime.

A yurt is designed to be dismantled and the parts carried compactly on camels or yaks to be rebuilt on another site. Complete construction takes around 2 hours.

Insulation and decoration, symbolism 
The traditional insulation and decoration within a yurt primarily exists of pattern-based woollen felted rugs. These patterns are generally not according to taste, but are derived from sacred ornaments with certain symbolism. Symbols representing strength are for instance the khas (swastika) or four powerful beasts (lion, tiger, garuda, and dragon), as well as stylized representations of the five elements (fire, water, earth, metal, and wood), considered to be the fundamental, unchanging elements of the cosmos. Such patterns are commonly used in the home with the belief that they will bring strength and offer protection.

Repeating geometric patterns are also widely used, like the continuous hammer or walking pattern (alkhan khee). Commonly used as a border decoration, it represents unending strength and constant movement. Another common pattern is the ulzii, a symbol of long life and happiness. The khamar ugalz (nose pattern) and ever ugalz (horn pattern) are derived from the shape of the animal's nose and horns, and are the oldest traditional patterns. All patterns can be found among not only the yurts themselves, but also on embroidery, furniture, books, clothing, doors, and other objects.

In Kyrgyz felted rug manufacturing the most common patterns are the Ala kiyiz and Shyrdak. Ornaments are visualising good wishes or blessing of the makers to a daughter who gets married, to children or grandchildren.

In Central Asia 

The shangyrak or wooden crown of the yurt is itself emblematic in many Central Asian cultures. In old Kazakh communities, the yurt itself would often be repaired and rebuilt, but the shangyrak would remain intact, passed from father to son upon the father's death. A family's length of heritage could be measured by the accumulation of stains on the shangyrak from decades of smoke passing through it. A stylized version of the crown is in the center of the coat of arms of Kazakhstan, and forms the main image on the flag of Kyrgyzstan.

Today a yurt is seen as a national symbol among many Central Asian groups, and as such, yurts may be used as cafés (especially those specialising in traditional food), museums (especially relating to national culture), and souvenir shops. In celebration of the city of Mary's year as Cultural Capital of the Turkic World, the government of Turkmenistan constructed a yurt-shaped structure, called Ak Öýi (White Building) and described as "The World's Largest Yurt", of concrete, granite, aluminum, and glass. Established on November 27, 2015, the structure is 35 meters high and 70 meters in diameter. According to the Turkmenistan state news agency, "A white yurt is a symbol of an age-old, distinctive historical-cultural legacy, a sign of preservation of our roots and origins." This three-story structure includes a café, offices, and VIP apartments as well as a large auditorium with 3,000 seats.

Buddhism in Mongolia 

The design of the Mongolian ger developed from its ancient simple forms to actively integrate with Buddhist culture. The crown—toono adopted the shape of Dharmachakra. The earlier style of toono, nowadays more readily found in Central Asian yurts, is called in Mongolia "sarkhinag toono" while the toono representing Buddhist dharmachakra is called "khorlo" (Tibetan འཀོར་ལོ།) toono. Also the shapes, colors and ornaments of the wooden elements—toono, pillars and poles of the Mongolian yurt are in accord with the artistic style found in Buddhist monasteries of Mongolia. Such yurts are called "uyangiin ger", literally meaning "home of lyrics" or "home of melodies".

Westernization 

Enthusiasts in other countries have adapted the visual idea of the yurt, a round, semi-permanent tent. Although those structures may be copied to some extent from the originals found in Central Asia, they often have some different features in their design to adapt them to different climate and use.

In Canada and the United States, yurts are often made using hi-tech materials. They can be highly engineered and built for extreme weather conditions. In addition, erecting one can take days and they may not be intended to be frequently moved. Such North American yurts are better thought of as yurt derivations, as they are no longer round felt homes that are easy to mount, dismount and transport. North American yurts and yurt derivations were pioneered by William Coperthwaite in the 1960s, after he was inspired to build them by a National Geographic article about Supreme Court Justice William O. Douglas's visit to Mongolia.

In 1978, American company, Pacific Yurts, became the first to manufacture yurts using architectural fabrics and structural engineering, paving the way for yurts to become popular attractions at ski resorts and campgrounds. Yurts are also popular in Northern Canada. In 1993, Oregon became the first state to incorporate yurts into its Parks Department as year round camping facilities. Since then, at least 17 other US States have introduced yurt camping into their own parks departments.

In Europe, a closer approximation to the Mongolian and Central Asian yurt is in production in several countries. These tents use local hardwood, and often are adapted for a wetter climate with steeper roof profiles and waterproof canvas. In essence they are yurts, but some lack the felt cover and ornate features across the exterior that is present in traditional yurt. There are UK-made yurts that feature a metal frame in use in at least two glamping sites in Somerset and Dorset.

The palloza is a traditional building found in the Serra dos Ancares in Galicia (NW Spain). Pallozas have stone walls and a conical roof made of stalks of rye.

Different groups and individuals use yurts for a variety of purposes, from full-time housing to school rooms. In some provincial parks in Canada, and state parks in several US states, permanent yurts are available for camping.

Since the late 1920s the German youth and Scouting movements have adapted a variant of the yurt and the Sami lavvu (Kohte), calling them Schwarzzelt (Black tents), a term mainly used for tents from North-Africa.

See also 

 Architecture of Mongolia
 Flag of Kyrgyzstan
 Ger district
 Igloo
 List of human habitation forms
 Tent
 Tipi
 Yaranga
 Vernacular architecture
 Alternative housing

References

External links 
	
Yurt Info – A comprehensive resource for yurts and related structures
Yurt Forum – A community resource for yurts and related structures
Yurt - World History Encyclopedia
What is Mongolia Ger?(Mongolia Yurt)
Timelapse of Yurt construction at Blackdown Yurts – Devon, England by Mike Lusmore 
Yurts of the Nomadic Chahar People. Inner Mongolia, China, 1874
Yurt living tips from experts

Central Asian culture
Indigenous architecture
House types
Tents
Vernacular architecture
Mongolian culture